Jane Bartkowicz (born April 16, 1949), known during her career as Peaches Bartkowicz, is a former top tennis player from the United States in the 1960s.

Bartkowicz was a protégé of Jean and Jerry Hoxie.  Among her many titles, Bartkowicz won both the singles and the doubles title in both 1966 and 1967 at Cincinnati. She also won the singles title at Canada in 1968. She reached the quarter-finals in singles at the US Open in 1968 and 1969.

Bartkowicz had a 7–0 record in singles in Fed Cup play, and was a member of the US team which won the cup in 1969.

As a youngster, Peaches won 17 junior titles including the girls' singles title at Wimbledon in 1964.  She attended Queens College in New York City.

She was part of the Original 9 group of women tennis players who took part in the inaugural 1970 Virginia Slims Circuit. Also she was a pioneer in using a double handed backhand.

Bartkowicz retired as a player in 1971. She has been enshrined in the United States Tennis Association/Midwest Hall of Fame.  She was inducted into the Michigan Sports Hall of Fame in 2002. She was inducted into the National Polish American Sports Hall of Fame on June 24, 2010. Martha MacIsaac plays Bartkowicz in the 2017 film Battle of the Sexes. Her sister Plums Bartkowicz was a national No. 1 junior tennis player but did not pursue a professional career.

WTA Tour finals

Singles 8 (6–2)

Doubles 6 (3-3)

Mixed doubles 2 (1-1)

References

External links 

 
 
 

1949 births
Living people
American female tennis players
People from Hamtramck, Michigan
Queens College, City University of New York alumni
Tennis people from Michigan
Grand Slam (tennis) champions in girls' singles
Tennis players at the 1968 Summer Olympics
Wimbledon junior champions
Sportspeople from Wayne County, Michigan
21st-century American women